Mamadou Fofana (born 17 September 2000) is a French professional footballer who plays as a midfielder for Ligue 2 club Amiens.

Career
Fofana made his professional debut for Le Havre in a 2–0 Ligue 2 draw against Troyes on 24 August 2020.

On 22 June 2021, he signed a three-year contract with Amiens.

Personal life
Fofana was born in France is of Malian and Mauritanian descent. He is the brother of the professional footballers Gueïda and Guessouma Fofana.

References

External links
 
 HAC Foot Profile

2000 births
Living people
Footballers from Le Havre
French footballers
French sportspeople of Malian descent
French sportspeople of Mauritanian descent
Association football midfielders
Le Havre AC players
Amiens SC players
Championnat National 2 players
Championnat National 3 players
Ligue 2 players